DhiTV is the first private TV channel of the Maldives to broadcast test signals and officially launch in the Maldives. It was inaugurated on 1 July 2008 by President Maumoon Abdul Gayoom. The channel is run by Broadcasting Maldives Pvt Ltd. Since the beginning DhiTV has captured the attention of viewers, and now it is one of the most watched local channels in the Maldives. Some of the major shows on DhiTV includes its news bulletins, English talk-show Fourth Estate, Dhivehi talk-show Khabarutherein, Weekend Show, Sports Extra, and more. DhiTV brings Tharinge Rey in every Ramadan which actors/actresses and singers sing couple songs.  DhiTV's transmission starts at 2pm and end at 12:30am rest of the time it airs the transmission of DhiFM plus. Mostly DhiTV is known as an anti-MDP channel and a politics, news, and current affairs channel thus it shows entertainment and sports programs. It also brings meetings of political parties and coverage of other events.

Nawaal, who was at TVM before is the CEO of DhiTV. Masood, famous presenter and Manager Customer Services of Dhiraagu is a Director, who himself presents DhiTVs most popular and longest-running show. In 2014 this show has gone off-air

Although DhiTV and DhiFM (first private radio station) are financed by Champa Mohamed Moosa and is operated in the same building, the two channels are operated separately by two different companies.

Closure 
The closure of the channel was abruptly announced to staff on Wednesday afternoon, just a day after the ruling Progressive Party of the Maldives dominated parliament approved a draconian law re-criminalising defamation. DhiFM, a radio station affiliated with the TV station, DhiFM plus, and the Dhivehi Online website were also shut down. A memo sent to staff at the radio and TV stations said that the network's parent companies, Broadcasting Maldives and Maldives Media Company, do not believe the channels “can be run in a sustainable manner under the current circumstances. ”Midhath Adam, DhiTV’s CEO, declined to comment. But people briefed on the closure said the decision was linked to the defamation law. “It is no longer safe to practice journalism,” an informed source said. DhiTV is mostly owned by tourism tycoon Mohamed Moosa, known as Champa Uchu. DhiTV and DhiFM responded to threat of action from the broadcast regulator by displaying an upside down picture of the chair of the Maldives Broadcasting Commission, Mohamed Shaheeb. In November 2012, the station's CEO was summoned to a parliamentary committee after MPs complained that it had aired defamatory content.

The transmission of the channel gone shutdown & DhiTV putted their final nail to coffin on 11 August 2016 & the official website of DhiTV existed  until 24 October 2016. the channel is no longer airing now.

References 

{
  "type": "FeatureCollection",
  "features": [
    {
      "type": "Feature",
      "properties": {},
      "geometry": {
        "type": "Point",
        "coordinates": [
          73.51154386997224,
          4.175760781119215
        ]
      }
    }
  ]
}

Mass media in the Maldives
Television channels and stations established in 2008
Television channels in the Maldives